Silvia Fontana (born 24 December 1961 in Tarragona, Spain) is a Spanish former backstroke swimmer who competed in the 1976 Summer Olympics.

References

1961 births
Living people
Spanish female backstroke swimmers
Olympic swimmers of Spain
Swimmers at the 1976 Summer Olympics
Sportspeople from Tarragona
Mediterranean Games bronze medalists for Spain
Mediterranean Games medalists in swimming
Swimmers at the 1975 Mediterranean Games
Swimmers from Catalonia
20th-century Spanish women